Sir Charles Stewart-Wilson  (1864 – 20 July 1950) was Barrister and an official in the Indian Civil Service who rose to become the  Indian Director-General of Posts and Telegraphs.

He was a prominent philatelist and one of the instigators, and the first President, of the Philatelic Society of India. He edited the Philatelic Journal of India from 1898 to 1905 and he signed the Roll of Distinguished Philatelists in 1921. Stewart-Wilson was also a Council Member of the Royal Philatelic Society London from 1915 to 1939.

Publications 
British Indian Adhesive Stamps Surcharged for Native States. Part I. Calcutta: Philatelic Society of India, 1897.
British Indian Adhesive Stamps Surcharged for Native States. Part II. Calcutta: Philatelic Society of India, 1899.
British Indian Adhesive Stamps surcharged for Native States. Calcutta: Philatelic Society of India, 1904. (Revised edition) (With B.G. Jones)
The Postage and Telegraph Stamps of British India. London: Stanley Gibbons for the Philatelic Society of India, 1907. (With C.S.F. Crofton and Leslie L. R. Hausburg.)

References 

1864 births
1950 deaths
British philatelists
Indian Civil Service (British India) officers
Knights Commander of the Order of the Indian Empire
British barristers
Philately of India
Signatories to the Roll of Distinguished Philatelists